Lawrence Free State High School (FSHS or LFS) is a public secondary school in Lawrence, Kansas, operated by Lawrence USD 497 school district, and serves students of grades 9 to 12.  It is one of two public high schools within the city limits of Lawrence.  The current enrollment is 1,786 students.  The school colors are hunter green, garnet red, and silver.  The current principal is Amy McAnarney.

Lawrence Free State is a member of the Kansas State High School Activities Association (KSHSAA) and offers a variety of sports programs. Athletic teams compete in the 6A division and are known as the "Firebirds". Extracurricular activities are also offered in the form of performing arts, school publications, and clubs. Free State's fine arts department received the 2019-2020 KSHSAA Performing Arts School of Excellence award.

History
Lawrence Free State was established in 1997 in response to overcrowding at Lawrence High School, the only public high school in Lawrence at the time. Almost one-third of students at Lawrence High transferred over to Free State at the start of the 1997 school year.

Academics
The College Board recognized Free State High with the 2007-08 Siemens Award for Advanced Placement Participation and Performance. One high school in each state receives this honor and a $1,000 grant for math and science education.

Extracurricular activities
The Firebirds compete in the Sunflower League and are classified as a 6A school, the largest classification in Kansas according to the Kansas State High School Activities Association. Throughout its history, Lawrence Free State has won fifteen state championships in various sports. Additionally, a small number of graduates have gone on to participate at the collegiate and professional levels.

Athletic programs
From the school's inception in 1997 until 2008, football games were played at Haskell Memorial Stadium. Some games were also played at Memorial Stadium at the University of Kansas.
They are now, however, played in a home stadium built in 2009–2010, when a stadium was built for Lawrence High School as well. The boys basketball team is coached by former KU All-American Sherron Collins.

Non-athletic programs
Free State has a strong music program that is recognized as a top program throughout the state of Kansas. The Free State chamber choir, advanced treble choir (Aurora), and concert chorale have all received "I" Ratings at KSHSAA every year since its inception in 1997. Free State's theatre program is regionally recognized and has performed shows such as Fiddler on the Roof, The Pajama Game and Anything Goes. The theatre program also performed at the Kansas Thespian Festival in Wichita in 2019 and was named a Gold Honor Troupe there. The Free State marching band were grand champions at the Missouri Western State University Tournament of Champions in 2000, 2001, and 2002, in addition to being finalists at the University of Central Missouri Festival of Champions in 2006 and 2007 and the Kansas Bandmasters Marching Championships in 2015. The Free State orchestra traveled to Los Angeles in early 2019 and is starting their tradition of excellence that they have been building since the school's inception. In Fall of 2019, Free State won the KSHSAA Performing Arts School of Excellence Award for the immense success in Choir, Band, Orchestra, Theater, Debate, and Forensics. 
In 2022, debate became the first extracurricular activity at Free State to win a National Championship by winning the 2022 Tournament of Champions.

State Championships

Notable alumni
Christian Ballard, former defensive end for the Minnesota Vikings
Cody Kukuk, former baseball player drafted by the Boston Red Sox

See also
 List of high schools in Kansas
 List of unified school districts in Kansas

References

External links
 

Public high schools in Kansas
Schools in Lawrence, Kansas
Educational institutions established in 1997
Lawrence, Kansas
1997 establishments in Kansas